The Flirt and the Bandit is a 1913 American silent short drama film directed by Lorimer Johnston starring R.D. Armstrong, Charlotte Burton, Ed Coxen, George Field, James Harrison and Chester Withey.

External links

1913 films
1913 drama films
Silent American drama films
American silent short films
American black-and-white films
1913 short films
Films directed by Lorimer Johnston
1910s American films